The Glenfiddich Spirit of Scotland Awards are annual awards given to notable Scottish people. It is sponsored by the Scotch whisky company Glenfiddich, in association with The Scotsman newspaper. Nine awards are given out for art, business, environment, food, music, screen, sport, writing, and "Top Scot". A consulting panel nominates four people in each category, with the winner decided by public vote. The "Top Scot" category is an open award, with the public able to nominate anyone. The awards were established in 1998.

2014

2013

2012

2011

2010
The consulting panel comprised John McLellan, editor at The Scotsman and other correspondents, Sally Gordon of Glenfiddich, Peter Irvine and Stuart Nisbet from Unique Events, Fiona Bradley of the Fruitmarket Gallery, Celia Stevenson, and David Sole.

2009

2008

2007
Kirsty Wark hosted the event held on Friday 30 November 2007

2006

2005
Lorraine Kelly hosted the event.

2004

2003

2002

2001

2000

1999

1998

See also
 Glenfiddich Food and Drink Awards

References

Scottish awards
1998 establishments in Scotland
Awards established in 1998
Scotch whisky
Annual events in Scotland